Phou Khe is a mountain in Southeast Asia, part of the Luang Prabang Range (ทิวเขาหลวงพระบาง).

It is at the east end of the Thai highlands, on the border between Laos and Thailand. The mountain lies straddles the border of Nan Province, Thailand and Sainyabuli Province, Laos. With a height of 2,079 metres and a prominence of 1,646 metres, Phou Khe is one of the ultra prominent peaks of Southeast Asia.

See also
List of Ultras of Southeast Asia
List of mountains in Thailand
Nan Province

References

Mountains of Laos
Mountains of Thailand
International mountains of Asia
Two-thousanders of Asia
Laos–Thailand border
Luang Prabang Range